The Synchrotron Radiation Source (SRS) at the Daresbury Laboratory in Cheshire, England was the first second-generation synchrotron radiation source to produce X-rays. The research facility provided synchrotron radiation to a large number of experimental stations and had an operating cost of approximately £20 million per annum.

SRS had been operated by the Science and Technology Facilities Council. The SRS was closed on 4 August 2008 after 28 years of operation.

History
Following the closure of the NINA synchrotron, construction of the facility commenced in 1975 and the first experiments were completed using the facility by 1981.

In 1986 the storage ring was upgraded with additional focusing to increase the output brightness, the new 'lattice' being termed the HBL (High Brightness Lattice).

Design and evolution
Like all second-generation sources, the SRS was designed to produce synchrotron radiation principally from its dipole magnets, but the initial design foresaw the use of a high-field insertion device to provide shorter-wavelength electromagnetic radiation to particular users.

The first storage ring design was a 2 GeV FODO lattice consisting of alternating focussing and defocussing quadrupoles, with one dipole following every quadrupole (i.e. two dipoles per repeating cell), giving a natural beam emittance of around 1000 nm-rad with 16 cells.

The HBL upgrade implemented in 1986 increased the total number of quadrupoles to 32, whilst retaining the same number of cells and geometry, and reduced the operating emittance to around 100 nm-rad in the so-called 'HIQ' (high tune) configuration. A 'LOQ' (low tune) configuration was also provided, to allow the efficient storage of one intense bunch of electrons (instead of up to 160), to provide radiation bursts at 3.123 MHz (the revolution frequency of the electrons, corresponding to the 96 m circumference).

Scientific Output and Achievements 
The SRS supported a broad range of science, including pioneering work on X-ray diffraction, structural molecular biology, surface physics and chemistry, materials science and upper atmosphere physics. Following its closure, a detailed study of the economic impact of the SRS was made.

Two Nobel Prizes in Chemistry have been received by scientists who performed part of their prize-winning research using the SRS: Sir John E. Walker  in 1997 for his contribution to the understanding of the synthesis of ATP (Adenosine Triphosphate), a key component of the body’s energy transport, and Sir Venki Ramakrishnan for his work on the structure and function of the Ribosome, the molecular machine that constructs proteins from ‘instructions’ coded in mRNA. Over 5000 academic papers were produced.

See also

 Diamond Light Source

References

External links
 Synchrotron Radiation Source
Articles on the history of the SRS

Research institutes in Cheshire
Science and Technology Facilities Council
Synchrotron radiation facilities